Scopula vicina is a moth of the family Geometridae found in Nigeria.

Taxonomy
Scopula vicina is a junior secondary homonym of Trygodes vicina described by Paul Thierry-Mieg in 1907 and requires a replacement name.

References

Endemic fauna of Nigeria
Moths described in 1917
vicina (Gaede, 1917)
Insects of West Africa
Moths of Africa